Boris Yoffe (born 21 December 1968 in St. Petersburg) is a Russian-born Israeli composer, resident of Karlsruhe, Germany.

Biography
Boris Yoffe initially studied violin but turned to composing early, premiering his first works in the St. Petersburg Philharmonic in 1983.

He emigrated to Israel before the break-up of Soviet Union, and completed his composition studies at the Rubin Academy of Music at Tel Aviv University. Later he moved to Karlsruhe, Germany to study with Wolfgang Rihm in 1997.  Around that time, the composer began composing a series of short  one-page pieces for string quartet. These were given a performance at ZKM in Karlsruhe in May 2003 and recorded on the ECM label by the Rosamunde Quartett with the Hilliard Ensemble. Boris Yoffe himself considers his work not specifically national: Russian, Israeli or German, but in principle ″belonging to all three cultures″.

References
Website of Boris Yoffe
Profil Boris Yoffe: Komponist in Ka-News (Karlsruhe, Germany) 23 August 2006 (in German)
M. Reiss  Boris Yoffe - an Israeli in Germany in Israel XXI Music Journal (in Russian)

External links
 Poems form the Book of Quartets on YouTube

Notes

1968 births
Living people
20th-century classical composers
21st-century classical composers
German opera composers
Male opera composers
Israeli composers
Musicians from Karlsruhe
Musicians from Saint Petersburg
German male classical composers
20th-century German musicians
20th-century German male musicians
21st-century German male musicians